Concord Hospital may refer to:

Concord Repatriation General Hospital in Sydney, Australia
Concord Hospital (New Hampshire), in the United States

See also 
Concord (disambiguation)

Trauma centers